City So Real is an American documentary miniseries directed by Steve James, revolving around the 2019 mayoral election in Chicago, Illinois, and the impact of the COVID-19 pandemic and social upheaval following the murder of George Floyd. It consists of 5 episodes and premiered on October 29, 2020, on National Geographic.

Premise
The series follows the 2019 mayoral election in Chicago, exploring corruption within the city, the impact of the COVID-19 pandemic, and social upheaval following the murder of George Floyd.

Episodes

Release
The series, originally just four episodes, had its world premiere at the Sundance Film Festival on January 27, 2020. In August 2020, National Geographic acquired distribution rights to the series.

Reception

Critical reception
On Rotten Tomatoes, the series holds an approval rating of 100% based on 13 reviews, with an average rating of 9.38/10. On Metacritic, the series has a weighted average score of 93 out of 100, based on 14 critics, indicating "universal acclaim".

Accolades

References

External links
 
 
 
 

2020s American documentary television series
2020 American television series debuts
English-language television shows
National Geographic (American TV channel) original programming